Teal Park is a public greenspace in Horseheads, New York. The park was added to the National Register of Historic Places in 1983 and is contained within the Horseheads 1855 Extension Historic District.

History

The land for the park was donated to the town in 1807.  In 1910, political cartoonist Eugene Zimmerman, a resident of the town, designed the bandstand still standing today, known as the Zim Bandstand. The park is adjacent to the Zimmerman House, which was Eugene's home.

Usage
During the summer, Teal Park is home to the Horseheads farmer's market which meets on every Saturday from 10 a.m. to 2 p.m. A concert series is held in the park every Thursday starting on the last Thursday of June, and ending in August.

References

Parks on the National Register of Historic Places in New York (state)
Parks in Chemung County, New York
National Register of Historic Places in Chemung County, New York